Henry Dreyfus may refer to:
Henri Dreyfus (1882–1944), Swiss chemist and co-inventor of Celanese
 The Camille and Henry Dreyfus Foundation
Henry Dreyfuss (1904–1972), American industrial designer
Henri Fursy (real name Henri Dreyfus, 1866–1929), French cabaret singer, director and lyricist.